Kamarupi Prakrit is the postulated Middle Indo-Aryan (MIA) Prakrit language used in ancient Kamarupa (5th–13th century). This language is the historical ancestor of the Kamatapuri lects and the modern Assamese language; and can be dated prior to 1250 CE, when the proto-Kamta language, the parent of the Kamatapuri lects, began to develop. Though not substantially proven, the existence of the language that predated the Kamatapuri lects and modern Assamese is widely believed.

The evidence of this MIA exist in systematic errors in the Sanskrit language used in the Kamarupa inscriptions.  A distinguishing characteristic of Kamarupa inscriptions is the replacement of ś and ṣ by s, which is contrary to Vararuci's rule, the main characteristic of Magadhi Prakrit, which warrants that ṣ and s are replaced by ś. Linguists claim this apabhramsa gave rise to various eastern Indo-European languages like modern Assamese and felt its presence in the form of Kamrupi and Kamatapuri lects.

Etymology of various names
The speech is known by different names, which generally consists of two words — prefix such as 'Kamrupi', 'Kamarupi', 'Kamarupa' referring to Kamarupa and suffixes 'dialect', 'Apabhramsa', sometimes 'Prakrit'. 
Suniti Kumar Chatterji named it as Kamarupa dialect (the dialect of Magadhi) as spoken in Kamarupa.
Sukumar Sen and others calls it as old Kamrupi dialect; the speech used in old Kamrup
Some scholars termed it as Kamrupi Apabhramsa, Kamarupi language or proto-Kamrupa.

Characteristics

Though the epigraphs were written in classical Sanskrit in kavya style of a high degree, they abound in forms varying from the standard.

 Loss of repha and reduplication of the remaining concerned consonants.
 Shortening of vowels.
 Lengthening of vowels.
 Substitution of one vowel for another.
 Avoidance and irregularity of sandhis.
 Loss of initial vowel.
 Substitution of Y by i.
 Total loss of medial Y.
 Reduplication of consonants immediately followed by r.
 Absence of duplication where it is otherwise necessary.
 Varieties of assimilation.
 Wrong analogy.
 Varied substitution for m and final m.
 Substitution of h by gh and substitution of bh by h.
 Indiscriminate substitution of one sibilant for another.
 Irregularity of declension in case of stems ending in consonants.
 Absence of visarga even where it is invariably necessary.

Apabhramsa

Some linguists claim that there existed a Kamrupi apabhramsa as opposed to the Magadhi apabhramsa from which the three cognate languages---Assamese, Bengali and Odia and Maithili---sprouted.  The initial motive comes from extra-linguistic considerations. Kamarupa was the most powerful and formidable kingdom in the region which provided the political and cultural influence for the development of the Kamrupi apabhramsa.

Xuanzang (or Hiuen Tsang), when he visited Kamarupa in 643 CE mentioned that the language spoken in Kamarupa was a 'little different' from the one spoken in mid-India is provided as evidence that this apabhramsa existed as early as the 5th century.

Geographical vicinity
Assamese, or more appropriately the old Kamarupi dialect entered into Kamrup or western Assam, where this speech was first characterized as Assamese. 
Golockchandra Goswami in his An introduction to Assamese phonology writes, "in early Assamese there seems to be one dominant dialect prevailing over the whole country, the Western Assamese dialect."
Similarly Upendranath Goswami says, "Assamese entered into Kamarupa or western Assam where this speech was first characterised as Assamese. This is evident from the remarks of Hiuen Tsang who visited the Kingdom of Kamarupa in the first half of the seventh century A.D., during the reign of Bhaskaravarman"

Works
The sample of the old Kamrupi dialect are found in different inscriptions scattered around eastern and northern India, such as Bhaskar Varman's inscriptions. Daka, a native of Lehidangara village of Barpeta composed an authoritative work named Dakabhanita in the 8th century A.D.

See also 
Apabhraṃśa
Middle Indo-Aryan languages

References

Bibliography

External links
 Assamese from Resource Center for Indian Language Technology Solutions, IIT, Guwahati

Eastern Indo-Aryan languages
Prakrit languages
Kamrupi culture
Kamarupa (former kingdom)